Blair Lyndon Joscelyne (also known as Moog) is an Australian composer, musician, producer, and film maker.  He is best known for composing music for television and film, and for being a co-creator of the YouTube series Mighty Car Mods.

Career 
After graduating from university he began working as a composer and audio engineer in the advertising industry. His music has been used in feature and short films as well as national and global advertising for companies for drinks companies for example Smirnoff, car companies, BMW and television and film companies for example, Discovery Channel,  National Geographic Channel and Touchstone Pictures. He has released four albums – 1978 (Solo), "The Sea Brings Rivalry", Finding May as part of the duo Finding May and "Coming Up For Air" under the name 'Solar'. The self-titled album from Finding May achieved considerable commercial success with songs licensed for use in high-profile TV shows and advertisements. The song "Rain Hail or Shine" was used by Arnott's across all of their commercials in 2009 while the song "Join In" was used in a TV commercial for Origin Energy which won the MADC for "Best use of a song in advertising 2009".

"Finding May" also produced and performed the theme song for Jetstar in Australia.

In March 2014, MOOG composed, recorded and produced the soundtrack to the MightyCarMods movie "Kei to the City". This soundtrack album reached all-time eighth most downloaded album on iTunes in Australia, and became the number one most downloaded electronic album in Canada, and Australia.

In 2015 he composed, recorded and produced the music for the National Geographic Channel series "Tales by Light". His music for this series was described as capturing the essence of the images with pure beauty.

Filmography
This is a list of films where Joscelyne has composed soundtracks.

Discography
This is a list of albums Joscelyne has composed under the name Moog.

References

1978 births
Living people
People from Launceston, Tasmania
Musicians from Sydney
Australian film score composers
Male film score composers